Thiomonas intermedia is a Gram-negative, aerobic, moderately acidophilic bacterium from the genus Thiomonas, which has the ability to oxidise sulfur compounds. Thiomonas intermedia was isolated from an sewage pipe in Hamburg.

References

External links
Type strain of Thiomonas intermedia at BacDive -  the Bacterial Diversity Metadatabase

Comamonadaceae
Bacteria described in 1997